Joseph Lee Druce (born Darrin Ernest Smiledge; April 15, 1965) is an American convicted murderer. While already serving a life sentence, Druce killed John Geoghan, a defrocked Roman Catholic priest who was convicted of sexually abusing children, and who had also been at the center of the Catholic sexual abuse scandal.

Murder of John Geoghan 
In August 2003, while in protective custody at the Souza-Baranowski Correctional Center in Lancaster, Massachusetts, Geoghan was trapped in his cell by Druce, who jammed the door closed so correction officers could not reach him.  Druce then strangled and stomped Geoghan to death.  An autopsy revealed Geoghan's cause of death to be "ligature strangulation and blunt chest trauma."

Investigation and trial 
The state immediately began an investigation into procedures at the prison.  There have been questions raised about the wisdom and propriety of placing these two men in the same unit, since prison officials had been warned by another inmate that Druce had something planned.  It was noted while two guards are normally stationed in the unit where Geoghan and Druce were being held, there was only one officer in the unit at the time – one had left temporarily to escort another inmate to a medical station.  Union officials had noted there were staffing cuts previously at the prison, which they feel led to the prison being a more dangerous and volatile place.

It has also been suggested Druce had been offered money to kill Geoghan, or Druce thought he would gain prestige from fellow prisoners for doing so. 

A Worcester, Massachusetts jury found Druce guilty of first-degree murder on January 25, 2006, after rejecting his insanity defense.  During the trial Druce was seen with a black eye he received from an individual who surprised him in his cell. The man who had surprised Druce was reported to have been wearing corrections officer pants, suggesting a reprisal by prison staff for the embarrassment surrounding Geoghan's murder. Druce was given a mandatory sentence of life in prison without parole.

In June 2007, The Boston Herald received a handwritten letter signed "Joseph Lee Druce", stating "The truth about officer involvement in John Geogan's (sic) death", along with an address for a YouTube video. The address contained a video taken by security cameras inside of Souza-Baranowski Correctional Center, made during the murder. The 10-minute video shows the attempts made by correctional officers to open the cell door (as many as five pulling at one time). Eventually the door is opened, officers extract Druce, and medical personnel enter the cell. However, inmates at Souza-Baranowski do not have Internet access.  Department of Correction officials were investigating who posted the video, as it is from an internal security camera.

At the time Druce killed Geoghan, he was already serving life without possibility of parole for killing a man who allegedly made a pass at him after picking Druce up hitchhiking.

In the interim between the two above crimes, Druce had become infamous for sending fake anthrax to lawyers with Jewish names from prison.

References

External links
 

American people convicted of murder
1965 births
Living people
Criminals from Massachusetts 
American prisoners sentenced to life imprisonment
Place of birth missing (living people)
Prisoners sentenced to life imprisonment by Massachusetts
People convicted of murder by Massachusetts
Violence against gay men
Violence against men in North America